The 2011 Australian Manufacturers' Championship was a CAMS sanctioned national motor racing championship for car manufacturers. It was the 26th manufacturers title to be awarded by CAMS and the 17th to be contested under the Australian Manufacturers' Championship name. The championship, which was open to modified production touring cars, also incorporated three drivers titles, the 2011 Australian Production Car Championship, the 2011 Australian Production Car Endurance Championship and the 2011 Australian Endurance Championship.

A major change from the 2010 championship saw a greater emphasis on longer races. Only the opening round of the series at Phillip Island comprising two short sprint races. Two rounds were extended into a six-hour endurance race format. The increased emphasis on endurance races saw the return of the long-running Sandown 500 event, last run for V8 Supercars in 2007.

Japanese manufacturer Mitsubishi won the Australian Manufacturers Championship, Stuart Kostera won the Australian Production Car Championship, Kostera and Ian Tulloch won the Australian Endurance Championship and the same pairing won the Australian Production Car Endurance Championship.

Defending Australian Production Car Champion, Western Australian Mitsubishi Lancer Evo driver Stuart Kostera dominated the series, winning six races and four rounds with a second position in the final race of the year at Eastern Creek. The result was so impressive, Kostera's part-time co-driver New Zealander Ian Tulloch finished second in the championship. In a clean sweep for Mitsubishi Lancer Evo drivers, Jim Pollicina finished third. The first non-Mitsubishi driver was Queenslander driver Jake Camilleri Mazda 3 in fourth.

The final race of the year, the Eastern Creek Six Hour, was the only race not won by Kostera. It was won by the BMW 335i of Chaz Mostert and Nathan Morcom.

Calendar
The championship was contested over a five-round series.

Class structure
Cars competed in the following six classes:
 Class A : Extreme Performance
 Class B : High Performance
 Class C : Performance Touring
 Class D : Production Touring
 Class E : Compact Touring
 Class I : Invitational (former Mini Challenge cars – not eligible for championship points)

Points system
Each manufacturer registered for the Australian Manufucturers' Championship was eligible to score points in each race, but only for the two highest placed automobiles of its make in any class.
 In rounds with one scheduled race, points were awarded to manufacturers on a 120–90–72–60–54–48–42–36–30–24–18–12–6 basis for the first thirteen places in each class with 3 points for other finishers.
 In rounds with two scheduled races, points were awarded to manufacturers on a 60–45–36–30–27–24–21–18–15–12–9–6–3 basis for the first thirteen places in each class in each race with 2 points for other finishers.

Points towards the Australian Production Car Championship outright title were awarded to drivers based on outright finishing positions attained in each race. Points were awarded using the same two scales as used for the Australian Manufacturers' Championship with the addition of two points for the driver setting the fastest qualifying lap in each class at each round.

Points towards the Australian Production Car Championship class titles were awarded to drivers based on class finishing positions attained in each race. Points were awarded using the same two scales as used for the Australian Manufacturers' Championship with the addition of two points for the driver setting the fastest qualifying lap in each class at each round.

Points towards the Australian Production Car Endurance Championship were awarded to drivers on a 120–90–72–60–54–48–42–36–30–24–18–12–6 basis for outright finishing positions attained in Rounds 2 and 5 of the championship.

Points towards the Australian Endurance Championship were awarded to drivers on a 120–90–72–60–54–48–42–36–30–24–18–12–6 for outright finishing positions attained in Rounds 2, 4 and 5 of the championship.

Drivers of Class I Invitational cars were not eligible to score points in any of the championships and points were allocated in all cases as though Class I cars were not competing in the race.

Championship results

Australian Manufacturers' Championship
Mitsubishi won the Manufacturers' Championship.

Australian Production Car Championship

Outright

Note: Drivers of Class I Invitational cars were not eligible to score points in any of the championships and points were allocated in all cases as though Class I cars are not competing in the race.

Points totals sourced partly from:

Race placings sourced from:

Classes
 Class A Extreme Performance was won by Stuart Kostera (Mitsubishi Lancer Evo X) from Ian Tulloch (Mitsubishi Lancer Evo X).
 Class B High Performance was won by Peter O’Donnell (BMW 335i).
 Class C Performance Touring was won by Jake Camilleri (Mazda 3 MPS).
 Class D Production Touring was won by Matt McGill (Toyota Celica).
 Class E Compact Touring was won by Grant Phillip (Proton Satria GTi) from Daryl Martin (Proton Satria GTi) and Andrew Turpie (Proton Satria GTi).

Australian Endurance Championship
The Australian Endurance Championship, which was contested over Rounds 2, 4 and 5 of the series, was won jointly by Stuart Kostera (Mitsubishi Lancer Evo X) and Ian Tulloch (Mitsubishi Lancer Evo X).

Australian Production Car Endurance Championship
The Australian Production Car Endurance Championship, which was contested over Rounds 2 and 5 of the series, was won jointly by Stuart Kostera (Mitsubishi Lancer Evo X) and Ian Tulloch (Mitsubishi Lancer Evo X) from Nathan Morcom (BMW 335i) and Chaz Mostert (BMW 335i).

References

External links
 Australian Manufacturers Championship
 Production Car Association of Australia 
 Natsoft Race Results Archive
 Images from the 2011 Phillip Island 6 Hour, Round 2 of the Championship

Australian Manufacturers' Championship
Australian Production Car Championship
Manufacturers' Championship